Raymond Kaskey (born 1943) is an American sculptor and architect who created Portlandia, a copper statue in Portland, Oregon. Born in Pittsburgh, Pennsylvania, he studied architecture at Carnegie Mellon University and Yale University. A fellow of the American Institute of Architects, he received the Henry Hering Medal from the National Sculpture Society for Portlandia.

Kaskey has threatened lawsuits against those who use portrayals of his work for commercial purposes.

Works 
 Portlandia, Portland, Oregon
 Art Rooney statue at Heinz Field, Pittsburgh, Pennsylvania
 Gateway of Dreams, Centennial Olympic Park, Atlanta, Georgia
 Bronze components for the World War II Memorial, Washington, D.C.

References

External links 
 Raymond Kaskey Website

1943 births
Living people
20th-century American sculptors
20th-century male artists
Carnegie Mellon University College of Fine Arts alumni
Yale School of Architecture alumni
21st-century American sculptors
21st-century male artists
Fellows of the American Institute of Architects